The Perfection is a 2018 American psychological horror thriller film directed by Richard Shepard, from a screenplay by Shepard, Nicole Snyder and Eric C. Charmelo. It stars Allison Williams, Logan Browning, and Steven Weber.

It had its world premiere at Fantastic Fest on September 20, 2018. It was released on May 24, 2019, by Netflix.

Plot
Charlotte Willmore is a talented young cellist who was forced to leave Bachoff, a prestigious music school in Boston, to care for her terminally ill mother. After her mother's death years later, Charlotte reaches out to Anton, the head of the academy, and travels to Shanghai to join him, his wife Paloma, and teachers Geoffrey and Theis in selecting a new student. Charlotte befriends Elizabeth “Lizzie” Wells, Anton's star pupil who replaced Charlotte at Bachoff. After a night of clubbing, they return to Lizzie's hotel room and have sex.

When Lizzie awakens with a hangover, Charlotte offers her some ibuprofen, which she takes with a shot of alcohol, and joins her on a trip through rural China. Boarding a bus after eating at a street food stall, Lizzie begins to feel progressively ill and takes more of Charlotte's ibuprofen. As her condition worsens, she throws up maggots and spirals into a panic, frightening the other passengers until the driver ejects her and Charlotte from the bus, stranding them in the countryside. Increasingly ill and paranoid, Lizzie sees bugs crawling inside her arm and eventually bursting out of her skin before Charlotte offers her a meat cleaver, and Lizzie hacks off her infected right hand.

It is revealed that Charlotte drugged Lizzie with medication prescribed to Charlotte's late mother, which can induce hallucinations (especially when consumed with alcohol), stole the meat cleaver from the food stall, and manipulated Lizzie into cutting off her own hand.

Three weeks later, Anton and Paloma give their new student from China, Zhang Li, a tour of Bachoff and the "Chapel," an acoustically perfect room where the academy's best students perform. That night, Lizzie arrives unexpectedly, her right hand missing. She explains her recollection of events to Anton and Paloma, and that she was discovered unconscious on the side of the road with a makeshift tourniquet around her arm, keeping her alive. Lizzie is adamant that Charlotte orchestrated the incident out of jealousy. Anton, initially sympathetic, turns cold and informs Lizzie the next day that she must leave the academy. On her way out, she looks at the photos in the hall and smashes a framed picture of Charlotte and Anton.

Lizzie travels to Minneapolis to confront Charlotte in her home, having broken in, and overpowers her with a taser before returning to Bachoff with Charlotte bound in the trunk of her car. When Charlotte awakens, she is confronted by Anton and reveals why she orchestrated Lizzie's dismemberment: the plot was spurred by Charlotte seeing a photo of Lizzie in a magazine with an eighth-note tattoo, a symbol for those indoctrinated into an elite group of students whom Anton and his peers sexually abuse as part of a sex cult. Charlotte also bears the tattoo, having experienced years of rape and torture at the hands of Anton for failing to achieve musical "Perfection," and planned Lizzie's amputation to save her from Bachoff, knowing that if she could no longer play the cello, Anton would have no use for Lizzie and discard her. Enraged, Anton brings Charlotte to the Chapel, where she is to perform for him, Paloma, Lizzie, Theis, Geoffrey, and an unwitting Zhang Li. She is seen sitting on the stage, chained by her ankles underneath a red dress, wearing red lipstick with her hair formally styled. Anton states to Charlotte that if she plays a complicated piece without error, she will be free to leave. If she makes an error, Zhang Li will "pay the price" (presumably sexual abuse as was inflicted on Charlotte). However, this is later revealed to be only a lie in order to throw Charlotte off her game.

After the performance in which Charlotte erred, Anton, Paloma, and Zhang Li leave the Chapel, and Theis and Geoffrey bind Charlotte, preparing to gang-rape her. Lizzie threatens to rape Charlotte with her hand stump as revenge, but Theis and Geoffrey suddenly collapse and die. Lizzie and Charlotte kiss, and it is revealed the two conspired together, poisoning the men's drinks. Charlotte's plot to render Lizzie expendable to the academy resulted in Lizzie coming to her senses about Anton's brainwashing, and together they plotted their revenge. Anton finds Paloma drugged and stabbed to death, and is confronted by Charlotte and Lizzie, armed with kitchen knives. They attack Anton, but he manages to wrest the knife from Charlotte, mutilating her arm before Lizzie knocks him unconscious.

Some unspecified time later, Anton, his mouth and eyes sewn shut and limbs amputated, is forced to listen as Charlotte and Lizzie perform for him in the Chapel playing as one, each compensating for the other's missing hand.

Cast
 Allison Williams as Charlotte Willmore 
 Molly Grace as Young Charlotte
 Logan Browning as Elizabeth "Lizzie" Wells 
 Milah Thompson as Young Lizzie
 Steven Weber as Anton, the head of Bachoff Academy.
 Alaina Huffman as Paloma, Anton's wife
 Mark Kandborg as Theis
 Graeme Duffy as Geoffrey
 Eileen Tian as Zhang Li

Production
In September 2017, it was announced Miramax would produce and finance the film, with Richard Shepard, directing from a screenplay by himself, Nicole Snyder and Eric Charmelo, with Bill Block producing. In October 2017, Allison Williams joined the cast of the film, with Stacey Reiss serving as a producer on the film. In December 2017, Logan Browning joined the cast of the film.

Release
The film had its world premiere at Fantastic Fest on September 20, 2018. Shortly after, Netflix acquired distribution rights to the film.
It was released on May 24, 2019.

Reception
The website's critical consensus reads, "Led by a pair of compelling performances, The Perfection is a smart, gripping thriller that barbs its wild twists with cutting wit." On Metacritic, it has a weighted average score of 60 out of 100, based on 15 critics, indicating "mixed or average reviews".

Dennis Harvey of Variety wrote that the film's story "is easier to admire than actually like, given somewhat repellent content grounded in character psychology that does not bear close scrutiny after these terse 90 minutes are over", but added: "the icily well-crafted gamesmanship Shepard and company have devised certainly makes that time pass quickly, if uncomfortably." Katie Rife of The A.V. Club gave the film a grade of B-, writing that it "takes deep, fetishistic satisfaction in pushing the envelope, then pushing it some more, building in seductive fits and shocking starts to an orgiastic frenzy of cinematic excess."

Barry Hertz of The Globe and Mail was more critical, giving the film a score of 1.5/4 and writing: "most everyone who watches The Perfection will instead be staring at the screen slack-jawed, dumbfounded at the gory silliness they endured."

Soundtrack
The soundtrack for the film features multiple classical arrangements of Bach, Mozart, and Handel, among others. It also features several non-classical tracks:

 "At Least I Still Have You" by Rose Liu 
 "Ready or Not" by Gizzle 
 "Let's Make This a Moment to Remember" by Chromatics 
 "It's On" by Deuce Mobb 
 "Petals" by Chromatics

References

External links
 
 

2018 films
2018 LGBT-related films
2010s feminist films
2018 horror thriller films
2010s psychological horror films
2018 psychological thriller films
American feminist films
American films about revenge
American horror thriller films
American LGBT-related films
American nonlinear narrative films
American psychological horror films
American psychological thriller films
2010s English-language films
Films about child sexual abuse
Films about classical music and musicians
Films about cults
Films produced by Bill Block
Films scored by Paul Haslinger
Films set in Boston
Films set in Minnesota
Films set in Shanghai
Lesbian-related films
LGBT-related horror thriller films
Miramax films
English-language Netflix original films
American rape and revenge films
Films directed by Richard Shepard
2010s American films